Kararname is a Turkish word for a proclamation, or a government decree, and may refer to:

Ottoman Empire and Turkey
 Kararname of 1296, on the Ottoman monetary system
 Ali Kararname, the Decree of Ali issued in 1867 during the Tanzimat era
 Kararname (League of Prizren), Issued by the Prizren League in 1878